Sven Grönblom (29 December 1913 – 23 August 2006) was a Finnish sailor. He competed in the 8 Metre event at the 1936 Summer Olympics.

References

External links
 

1913 births
2006 deaths
Finnish male sailors (sport)
Olympic sailors of Finland
Sailors at the 1936 Summer Olympics – 8 Metre
Sportspeople from Turku